Modesta Justė Morauskaitė (born 2 October 1995) is a Lithuanian sprinter, who specializes in the 400m and snowboarder. 

In 2011 she became the first Lithuanian national champion in Snowboarding Cross event at Lithuanian Snowboarding Championships. She participated in FIS Junior Snowboarding Championships in 2011, 2012 and 2013.

In 2014 Morauskaitė debuted in 2014 European Athletics Championships, where she finished 27th in individual 400m event and 11th in 4 × 400 m relay. During 2018 European Athletics Championships sprinter was 18th in individual 400m event and 15th in 4 × 400 m relay. Morauskaitė was a part of first Lithuanian team to participate in 2019 IAAF World Relays

References

1995 births
Living people
Lithuanian female sprinters
Sportspeople from Vilnius
Lithuanian snowboarders
European Games competitors for Lithuania
Athletes (track and field) at the 2019 European Games
20th-century Lithuanian women
21st-century Lithuanian women